Wall Street is the fourth studio album by Norwegian glam metal band Wig Wam. It was released on 21 May 2012. The single "Wall Street" was released on 24 February 2012.

Wall Street was the last album recorded by Wig Wam before their breakup in 2013.

Track listing

Chart positions

References 

Wig Wam albums
2012 albums